The Most Popular Girls in School (abbreviated MPGIS) is an American stop-motion animated comedy web series that debuted on YouTube on May 1, 2012. Created by Mark Cope and Carlo Moss, the series animates Barbie, Ken and other fashion dolls, usually with customized costumes and hairstyles, as various characters. MPGIS follows the exploits of the fictional Overland Park High School cheerleading squad and their friends, family and enemies. Variety described the series as "Mean Girls meets South Park". To date, over 80 episodes have been released. The first episode has been viewed 11 million times, and many episodes have received views in the millions. After a year hiatus, the fifth season premiered June 13, 2017.

Series overview

Episodes

Season 1 (2012)

Season 2 (2013)

Season 3 (2013–2014)

Season 4 (2015)

Season 5 (2017)

References

External links
 
 

Lists of American adult animated television series episodes
Lists of American comedy television series episodes
Lists of web series episodes